Galatasaray S.K. Men's 2012–2013 season is the 2012–2013 basketball season for Turkish professional basketball club Galatasaray Medical Park

The club competes in:
Turkish Basketball League
Eurocup
Turkish Cup Basketball

Players

Depth chart

Squad changes for the 2012–2013 season
In:

Out:

Competitions

Turkish Basketball League regular season

Turkish Basketball League play-offs

Eurocup

Regular season

Game 1

Game 2

Game 3

Game 4

Game 5

Game 6

Last 16

Game 1

Game 2

Game 3

Game 4

Game 5

Game 6

References

Galatasaray S.K. (men's basketball) seasons
Gala
Galatasaray Sports Club 2012–13 season